Daniel Lane (1861 - 3 June 1940) was an Irish hurler who played as a forward for the Cork senior team.

Born in Coachford, County Cork, Lane first played competitive hurling in his youth, prior to the establishment of the Gaelic Athletic Association. He arrived on the inter-county scene at the age of twenty-nine when his club team represented Cork. In his sole season with Cork, Lane won one All-Ireland medal and one Munster medal.

He was Cork's first ever winning Munster and All-Ireland winning captain. 

At club level Lane was a one-time championship medallist with Aghabulloge.

Playing career

Club
Lane played his hurling with his local club in Aghabullogue and enjoyed some success.  He won a county senior championship title in 1890 following a 7-3 to 1-1 defeat of Aghada.  It remains Aghabullogue's only senior county final victory.

Inter-county
Lane first came to prominence on the inter-county scene with Cork as part of the Aghabullogue selection in 1890.  That year he lined out in his first provincial decider with Kerry providing the opposition.  The game was far from exciting, however, at full-time Cork were the champions by 2-0 to 0-1. It was Lane's first Munster title.  Cork's next game was an All-Ireland final meeting with Wexford.  The game was a controversial one and was marred by ill-tempered behaviour.  A Cork player had his toe broken by one of his Wexford counterparts.  As captain, Lane led his men off the field in protest.  At the time Cork were trailing by 2-2 to 1-6, however, the GAA's Central Council later backed Cork and Lane collected an All-Ireland title.  It was his only season with Cork.

Honours

Aghabullogue
Cork Senior Hurling Championship (1): 1890 (c)

Cork
All-Ireland Senior Hurling Championship (1): 1890 (c)
Munster Senior Hurling Championship (1): 1890 (c)

Sources
 Corry, Eoghan, The GAA Book of Lists (Hodder Headline Ireland, 2005).
 Cronin, Jim, A Rebel Hundred: Cork's 100 All-Ireland Titles.
 Donegan, Des, The Complete Handbook of Gaelic Games (DBA Publications Limited, 2005).

References

 

1861 births
1940 deaths
Aghabullogue hurlers
Cork inter-county hurlers
All-Ireland Senior Hurling Championship winners